The Socialist Students' Front (SSF) is a Marxist–Leninist student organization in Bangladesh. SSF is one of the largest leftist students' organization in the country. The slogans of the SSF are:  "Socialist Students' Front, commitments to the revolution!",  "Socialist Students' Front, commitments to save the rights of education!" SSF also maintains a good relation with All India Students Association.

History
The SSF was founded on 21 January 1984 amidst the movement against the military dictatorship. It played a major role in overthrowing the dictator Hussain Muhammad Ershad and bringing about democratic rule in 1990. The main objective of the SSF is to build a students’ movement throughout the country to bring about educational reforms to make education accessible, universal, scientific, secular, equal, and democratic, and to create an education system that is conducive to the growth and development of a revolutionary movement for the overthrow of capitalism and establishment of socialist state. SSF is a member of several international students' organizations including World Federation of Democratic Youth.

SSF's motto is "Unity, Struggle, Progress." SSF's flag contains three white five cornered stars in the top left corner, on a red background. The ratio of length and width of the flag is 3:2. SSF's monogram is a raised fist with three stars.

SSF's publishes an official organ, Ovimot (Bengali: অভিমত; English: The Intention/Opinion). It is published in Bengali by the Central Committee.

Central Committee

The organization elected its most recent central committee through the 18th Central Council that took place on 11–13 December 2021 at Shaheed Munir Chowdhury Auditorium in the University of Dhaka. The latest central committee members of the organization are:
 President: Mukta Barai
 Vice-president: Raihan Uddin
 General Secretary: Shovon Rahman
 Organising Secretary: Rajib Kanti Roy
 Office Secretary: Anik Kumar Das
 Finance Secretary: Sultana Akhter
 Promotion and Publication Secretary: Suhail Ahmed Shuvo
 School Affairs Secretary: Rizu Lakshmi Aboroadh
 International Affairs Secretary: Susmita Moriom
 Members:
 Jugesh Tripura
 Dhanonjoy Barman
 Rehnoma Rubaiyat
 Laboni Sultana
 Biswajit Nandi
 Rina Murmu
 Anarul Islam
 Fazlul Haque Roni
 Harun-or-Rashid
 Abu Sayeid
 Labony Banya
 Rhythm Shahriar
 Bijon Sikder

Mass organizations of SSF
SSF has children, teenager, science, and cultural wings to work with different classes of people. Some of the organizations include:
 Shishu Kishor Mela (SKMela)
 Biggan Andolan Moncho (BAM) - Platform of Science Movement (PSM)
 Charan Cultural Center (CCC)

Notable movements 
SSF was founded during the movement against the military rule of Hussain Muhammad Ershad and it played an important role in building the students' movement against the military rule. Since then, it has led numerous movements in the history of students' politics in Bangladesh.
 Mass movement against privatization of education in 1986.
 Movement against the educational policy proposed by the Majid Khan Commission on 14 February 1983.
 A strong movement against the fee hike and bus fair hike in 1987. Its first conference was also held in 28 January of the same year. In the same year, it also formed and led an alliance of 22 students organization to strengthen the ongoing movement against Hussain Muhammad Ershad.
 It formed the historic All Party Students' Alliance in 1990 which essentially helped to bring down the autocratic regime and bring about democracy in Bangladesh.
 Organized an anti-rapist movement at Jahangirnagar University in 1998 that resulted in the High Court order forming the Anti-Sexual Harassment Cell for organizations and institutions in Bangladesh.
 6 days long education conference consisting of 10 sessions by 129 renowned speakers in 16–21 September 1999.
 Occupy UGC movement in 2006 to reject the 20 years strategic plan.
 Organizing Gonojagaran Mancha, a movement for the punishment of war criminals in 2013.
 Movement demanding justice for Shohagi Jahan Tonu, a student of Comilla Victoria Government College who was raped inside Comilla Cantonment in 2017.
 Organizing its 5th Central Conference and a movement to raise budget allocation in education on 25 September 2019.
 Anti-Rape long march to Noakhali District protesting the rape and violence against women in 2020.
 Movement against Digital Security Act and protesting the death of the writer Mushtaq Ahmed in police custody, who was arrested under the act in 2021.

See also
 List of student organizations in Bangladesh

References

External links
  

Student organisations in Bangladesh
Bangladeshi student movements
Student wings of political parties in Bangladesh
Student organizations established in 1984